In 1894 the Cuyler and Woodburn Railroad built a  line between Cuyler and Woodburn, Georgia, USA.  The railroad had also planned to build an additional line to Statesboro, Georgia.  The railroad was sold under foreclosure in 1897 and was reorganized as the Savannah and Statesboro Railway.

Defunct Georgia (U.S. state) railroads
Railway companies established in 1894
Railway companies disestablished in 1897